Bhārya (Sanskrit for "wife") may refer to:

 Bharya (1962 film), an Indian Malayalam-language film
 Bharya, a 1968 Indian Telugu-language film with art direction by V. V. Rajendra Kumar
 Bharya, a 1994 Indian Malayalam-language film starring Urvashi
 Bharya (TV series), a 2016–2019 Indian Malayalam-language thriller series

See also
 
 
 Bharia (disambiguation)